Maoricrypta kopua is a species of sea snail, a marine gastropod mollusk in the family Calyptraeidae, the slipper snails or slipper limpets, cup-and-saucer snails, and Chinese hat snails.

Description
Maoricrypta kopua are small to medium-sized sea snails.

References

External links

Calyptraeidae
Gastropods described in 2003